Papua New Guinea was represented at the 2006 Commonwealth Games in Melbourne by a 38-member strong contingent comprising a number of sportspersons and officials.

2006 Commonwealth Games Medal Count- Medals

Medalists

Gold
 Ryan Pini, Swimming, Men's 100m Butterfly

Silver
 Dika Loa Toua, Weightlifting, Women's 53 kg

Bronze
 none

References

Papua New Guinea at the Commonwealth Games
Nations at the 2006 Commonwealth Games
2006 in Papua New Guinean sport